Marieme Ba (born 22 April 1998) is a Senegalese handball player for US Alfortville and the Senegalese national team. 

She competed at the 2019 World Women's Handball Championship in Japan.

References

1998 births
Living people
Senegalese female handball players